Tomás Arias Ávila (December 29, 1856 in Panama City, Panama – July 20, 1932 in Panama City, Panama) was a Panamanian politician and businessman who was, together with José Agustín Arango and Federico Boyd, a member of the provisional junta that governed Panama after its independence in 1903.

Tomás Arias was the son of Ramon Arias and Manuela Avila. A businessman, Arias attended schools in Panama, Jamaica, and the United States. Arias was one of the leaders during the emancipation movement in 1903.  His brother, Ricardo Arias, was also part of the movement. Tomás Arias's eloquence and talent as a public speaker won him the designation of diplomat representing the Isthmus of Panama.

During his political career he held several posts: Treasury administrator, Departmental Assembly deputy (1882), representative to the Colombian Congress, senator (1888-1892), government secretary (1893-1900), foreign relations minister, chairman of the National Assembly (1906), minister of Panama in Mexico, consul, President of the Republic of Panama (1903-1904).

Arias, as well as José Agustín Arango, defended the Hay–Bunau-Varilla Treaty because he was convinced that it was the only guarantee of the possible construction of the Panama Canal.

He died in Panama City, Panama on July 20, 1932 at the age of 75.

References
 http://www.pancanal.com/eng/history/proceres/arias.html
• Mellander, Gustavo A., Mellander, Nelly, Charles Edward Magoon: The Panama Years. Río Piedras, Puerto Rico: Editorial Plaza Mayor. ISBN 1-56328-155-4. OCLC 42970390. (1999)
• Mellander, Gustavo A., The United States in Panamanian Politics: The Intriguing Formative Years." Danville, Ill.: Interstate Publishers. OCLC 138568. (1971)

1856 births
1932 deaths
People from Panama City
Conservative Party (Panama) politicians
Presidents of Panama